John Phillips Jenkins "Count" Sensenderfer (December 28, 1847 – May 3, 1903) was a professional baseball player who played for the Philadelphia Athletics from 1866 to 1874.

Early life
John Phillip Jenkins Sensenderfer was born on December 28, 1847, in Philadelphia, Pennsylvania, to James, a carpenter, and his wife Mary. Initially, he grew up in the Spring Garden neighborhood of Philadelphia, but later moved to different parts of the city. He had at least three brothers (George, William, James), and two sisters (Mary and Hannah).

Career
Sensenderfer joined the Athletic club at the age of eighteen in 1866, and "The Count" (he got the nickname from his moustache and aristocratic air) quickly became of the top players in the country. Originally playing second base before moving to center field, Count was one of the first players to score two hundred runs in a season, for the championship Philadelphia team of 1868. The following year, Athletic turned professional; in 1871 the club helped form the National Association of Professional Base Ball Players, baseball's first all-professional league.

It was in 1871 that Sensenderfer (still a solid hitter with a .323 average) began to be plagued by a series of injuries; he was unable to play in the championship contest played October 30 in Brooklyn. (Right fielder George Bechtel took Count's place in center, while Nate Berkenstock, a 40-year-old amateur retired from Athletic for five years, played right; it was his only big-league appearance.) Athletic defeated Chicago, 4-1, clinching the title.

Sensenderfer's injuries kept him out of all but one game in 1872; he returned as the club's regular center fielder in 1873 but his average slipped to .279. He played five more games for Athletic in 1874 before retiring.

After baseball
On October 20, 1881, Sensenderfer married Mary Eudora Wagner in Philadelphia, and listed his religion as protestant episcopal. 
 
After his baseball career, Sensenderfer was involved in politics, serving two terms as Philadelphia County Commissioner. He was also an active member of the Democratic Committee of Philadelphia as well as the Pennsylvania Democratic State Committee.

Sensendefer died on May 3, 1903, at the age of 55 in Philadelphia, and is interred at Lawnview Cemetery in Rockledge, Pennsylvania.

References

External links

1847 births
1903 deaths
Major League Baseball center fielders
Philadelphia Athletics (NABBP) players
Philadelphia Athletics (NA) players
19th-century baseball players
Baseball players from Philadelphia
Minor league baseball managers
Philadelphia Athletic players
Pennsylvania Democrats